Tetyana Styazhkina, also written as Tetyana Stiajkina, (born 10 April 1977) is a Ukrainian cycle racer who rides for the Chirio Forno d'Asolo team. She is a climber, featured in the Vuelta a El Salvador.

She competed at the 2000 and 2008 Summer Olympics.

U23 Career Highlights

1999
European Road Championships - Time Trial
European Road Championships - Road Race

Elite Career Highlights

1997
1st, Giro della Toscana - Prologue

2000
1st, Tour de l'Aude - Stage 8
1st, Tour de Suisse - Stage 4

2002
1st, Ukrainian National Road Championships - Time Trial
1st, Trophée d'Or Féminin - General Classification
1st, Trophée d'Or Féminin - Stage 2
1st, Trophée d'Or Féminin - Stage 5
1st, Trophée d'Or Féminin - Stage 6

2003
1st, Eko Tour Dookola Polski - General Classification
1st, Eko Tour Dookola Polski - Stage 2

2007
1st, Grand Prix de Santa Ana
1st, Vuelta a El Salvador - Stage 1

2008

1st, Vuelta a El Salvador - General Classification
1st, Vuelta a El Salvador - Stage 4
1st, Ukrainian National Road Championships - Time Trial
1st, Ukrainian National Road Championships - Road Race

References

1977 births
Living people
Ukrainian female cyclists
Cyclists at the 2000 Summer Olympics
Cyclists at the 2008 Summer Olympics
Olympic cyclists of Ukraine
Sportspeople from Simferopol